Karolína Hájková (born 14 December 1997) is a Slovak swimmer. She competed in the women's 200 metre backstroke event at the 2017 World Aquatics Championships. She is currently a member of the swimming and diving team at the University of Hawaii at Manoa.

References

External links
Hawaii bio

1997 births
Living people
Sportspeople from Bratislava
Slovak female swimmers
Swimmers at the 2014 Summer Youth Olympics
Female backstroke swimmers
Hawaii Rainbow Wahine swimmers